F. Henry "Hank" Habicht II (born April 10, 1953) is an American attorney who served as the United States Assistant Attorney General for the Environment and Natural Resources from 1983 to 1987 and as the Deputy Administrator of the United States Environmental Protection Agency from 1989 to 1993.

Early life and education 
Hank graduated magna cum laude from Princeton University’s Woodrow Wilson School of Public and International Affairs in 1975 and received his J.D. degree from the University of Virginia in 1978.

References

United States Assistant Attorneys General for the Environment and Natural Resources Division
People of the United States Environmental Protection Agency
Washington, D.C., Republicans
1953 births
Living people